Nathaniel G. Moore (born July 15, 1974) is a Canadian writer from Toronto, Ontario. Moore's literary journalism has been published throughout Canada. He currently lives in New Brunswick.

Notable bibliography
Let's Pretend We Never Met (2007)
Toronto Noir (2008) as co-editor
Wrong Bar (2009) 
Savage (2013)
Jettison (2016)
Honorarium: essays 2001-2021 (2021)
Constrictor (2021)

Recognition   
Nathaniel G. Moore's 2013 book Savage 1986-2011, won the 2014 ReLit Awards for best novel.  He also serves as the lead singer of the non-fiction electro-folk band, Proper Concern with Warren Auld. Moore's latest poetry collection Constrictor was published in 2021.

See also
Canadian literature
List of Canadian writers

References

Canadian male novelists
20th-century Canadian poets
Canadian male poets
21st-century Canadian novelists
Living people
Writers from Fredericton
Writers from Toronto
20th-century Canadian male writers
21st-century Canadian male writers
Year of birth missing (living people)